Pheidole purpurea is a dimorphic species of ant found in Mexico and Central America. The species shows considerable variance in physical characteristics based on location, though some variance exists even within small populations. Some populations display a metallic, purple sheen.

Dimorphic subdivision
Like many species of the genus Pheidole, P. purpurea is dimorphic, with workers visibly differentiated by head size and shape into "minor" and "major" (or soldier) workers. The head of the major worker can be as much as twice as long and more than twice as wide as that of the minor.

References

External links

purpurea
Hymenoptera of North America
Insects described in 2009